The Los Angeles Angels are an American professional baseball team based in the Los Angeles metropolitan area. The Angels compete in Major League Baseball (MLB) as a member club of the American League (AL) West division. Since 1966, the team has played its home games at Angel Stadium in Anaheim, California.

The franchise was founded in Los Angeles in 1961 by Gene Autry as one of MLB's first two expansion teams and the first to originate in California. Deriving its name from an earlier Los Angeles Angels franchise that played in the Pacific Coast League (PCL), the team was based in Los Angeles until moving to Anaheim in 1966. Due to the move, the franchise was known as the California Angels from 1965 to 1996 and the Anaheim Angels from 1997 to 2004. "Los Angeles" was added back to the name in 2005, but because of a lease agreement with Anaheim that required the city to also be in the name, the franchise was known as the Los Angeles Angels of Anaheim until 2015. The current Los Angeles Angels name came into use the following season.

The Angels won the World Series in 2002, their first and only championship appearance to date. They are one of three MLB franchises to win their sole appearance in the World Series. This was followed by an era in which the Angels made six playoff berths within a decade and saw an increase in fan attendance, consistently placing the franchise among the top draws in MLB. The Angels have accumulated national attention since 2012 with the emergence of three-time AL Most Valuable Player Mike Trout and an international following since 2018 with the signing of Japanese two-way player Shohei Ohtani.

History

The "Los Angeles Angels" name originates from the first Los Angeles-based sports team, the Los Angeles Angels, who took the name "Angels" from the English translation of "Los Angeles", which means "The Angels" in Spanish. The team name started in 1892; in 1903, the team name continued in L.A. through the PCL, which is now a minor league affiliate of MiLB. The Angels franchise of today was established in MLB in 1961 after former owner Gene Autry bought the rights to continue the franchise name from Walter O'Malley, the former Los Angeles Dodgers owner who had acquired the franchise from Phil Wrigley, the owner of the Chicago Cubs at the time. As stated in the book Under the Halo: The Official History of Angels Baseball, "Autry agreed to buy the franchise name for $350,000, and continue the history of the previously popular Pacific Coast League team as his own expansion team in the MLB." After the Angels joined the Major Leagues, some players from the Angels' PCL team joined the Major League Angels in 1961.

As an expansion franchise, the club continued in Los Angeles as the "Los Angeles Angels", and played their home games at Los Angeles' Wrigley Field (not to be confused with Chicago's ballpark of the same name), which had formerly been the home of the PCL Los Angeles Angels. The Angels were one of two expansion teams established as a result of the 1961 Major League Baseball expansion, along with the second incarnation of the Washington Senators (now Texas Rangers).

The team's founder, entertainer Gene Autry, owned the franchise for its first 36 years. During Autry's ownership, the team made the playoffs three times, but never won the pennant. The team has gone through several name changes in their history, first changing their name to the California Angels on September 2, 1965, with a month still left in the season, in recognition of their upcoming move to the newly constructed Anaheim Stadium in Anaheim at the start of the 1966 season. The City of Anaheim contributed $30 million to the $118 million renovation with a renegotiated lease providing that the names of both the stadium and team contain the word "Anaheim". The team was renamed the Anaheim Angels and became a subsidiary of Disney Sports, Inc. (later renamed Anaheim Sports, Inc.). Under Disney's ownership and the leadership of manager Mike Scioscia, the Angels won their first pennant and World Series championship in 2002.

In 2005, new owner Arturo Moreno added "Los Angeles" to the team's name. In compliance with the terms of its lease with the city of Anaheim, which required "Anaheim" be a part of the team's name, the team was officially renamed the Los Angeles Angels of Anaheim. Fans, residents, and the municipal governments of both Anaheim and Los Angeles objected to the change, with the City of Anaheim pursuing litigation; nevertheless, the change was eventually upheld in court and the city dropped its lawsuit in 2009. The team usually refers to itself as the Angels or Angels Baseball in its home media market, and the name "Los Angeles" never appears in the stadium, on the Angels' uniforms, nor on official team merchandise. However, throughout the team's history in Anaheim, the uniforms have traditionally said "Angels" instead of the city or state name, depending on the team's geographic identifier at the time. Local media in Southern California tend to omit a geographic identifier and refer to the team as the Angels or the Halos. The Associated Press, the most prominent news service in the U.S., refers to the team as the Los Angeles Angels, the Angels, or Los Angeles. In 2013, the team officially planned to drop "of Anaheim" from its name and restore its original name "Los Angeles Angels", as part of a new Angel Stadium lease negotiated with the Anaheim city government. Although the deal was never finalized, as of 2020, most official sources omit the "of Anaheim" suffix.

On December 20, 2019, the city of Anaheim voted to sell Angel Stadium and the land around it to a group led by the team owner Arte Moreno for $325 million. The deal would have included a new or refurbished stadium, 5,175 apartments and condominiums, 2.7 million square feet (251,000 square meters) of office space, and 1.1 million square feet (102,000 square meters) of retail stores, restaurants and hotels. The deal was later canceled by the city council due to bribery and corruption allegations by the FBI on the deal between an Angels Baseball employee and Anaheim mayor Harry Sidhu, allegedly in exchange for a $1 million campaign contribution toward the mayor's reelection. Mayor Sidhu resigned on May 24, 2022.

Culture
The mantra "Win One for the Cowboy" is a staple that is deeply rooted in Angels history for fans. The saying refers to the Angels' founder and previous owner, Gene Autry, who never saw his Angels win a World Series in his 38 years as owner. Years went by as the team experienced many losses just strikes away from American League pennants. By the time the Angels won their first World Series in 2002, Autry had been dead for four years. After winning the World Series, Angels player Tim Salmon ran into the home dugout and brought out one of Autry's signature white Stetson hats in honor of the "singing cowboy". Autry's #26 was retired as the 26th man on the field for the Angels.

Angel Stadium of Anaheim is nicknamed "The Big A". It has a section in center field nicknamed the "California Spectacular", a formation of artificial rocks made to look like a desert mountain in California. The California Spectacular has a running waterfall, and also shoots fireworks from the rocks before every game; anytime the Angels hit a home run or win a home game the fireworks shoot from the rocks as well.

Each game begins with the song "Calling All Angels" by Train being played accompanied by a video that shows historical moments in team history, with an instrumental version of Norman Greenbaum's "Spirit in the Sky" being played during the team's starting lineup announcement.

Since 2016, the Angels' home run song has been "Bro Hymn" by Pennywise. Previous home run songs include "Song 2" by Blur, "Chelsea Dagger" by The Fratellis, "Kernkraft 400" by Zombie Nation, and "Killin' It" by Krewella.

Other phrases associated with Angel wins include "Just another Halo victory!", popularized by late Angels broadcaster Rory Markas; and before that: "And the Halo shines tonight!" used by legendary broadcaster Dick Enberg. Also, after a win the song "Paradise City" by Guns N' Roses is usually played.

The Angels organization was the first North American team to employ the use of thundersticks.

The Rally Monkey

The Rally Monkey is a mascot for the Angels which appears if the Angels are losing a game or if the game is tied from the 7th inning on, but sometimes earlier depending on the situation. The Rally Monkey appears on the scoreboard in various movies or pop culture references that have been edited to include him.

The Rally Monkey was born in 2000 when the scoreboard showed a clip from Ace Ventura: Pet Detective, after which the Angels rallied to win the game. The clip proved to be so popular that the team hired Katie, a white-haired capuchin monkey, to star in original clips for later games. When seen, she jumps up and down to the House of Pain song "Jump Around" and holds a sign that says "RALLY TIME!"

The Rally Monkey came to national and worldwide attention during the Angels' appearance in the 2002 World Series against the San Francisco Giants. In the Game 6 of the series, the Angels were playing at home, but were trailing the series three games to two and facing elimination. They were down 5–0 as the game entered the bottom of the 7th inning. Amid fervid rally-monkey themed fan support, the Angels proceeded to score six unanswered runs over the next two innings, winning the game and turning the momentum of the series for good (they went on to clinch the championship in Game 7).

From 2004 to 2009, the Angels reached the postseason five times, sparking a renewal of the Rally Monkey's popularity.

Popularity
The Angels drew more than 3 million fans to the stadium from 2003 to 2019, and at least 2 million since 2002, and a game average in 2010, 2011, 2012, and 2013 of 40,000 fans at each game despite not making the playoffs all four years. This is 2nd in all of MLB, only trailing the New York Yankees. In 2019, the Angels were fifth in MLB in attendance, with a total of 3,019,012 people.

As of 2015, the Angels fans have set six Guinness World Records for the largest gatherings of people wearing blankets, wrestling masks, cowboy hats, wigs, Santa hats, superhero capes, and sombreros. They have also set the world record for largest gathering of people with selfie sticks.
In 2009, the Angels were voted as the number one franchise in professional sports in Fan Value by ESPN magazine. In 2012, ESPN & Fan polls by ESPN ranked the Angels fifteenth in the best sports franchises, third best among MLB teams. The rankings were determined through a combination of sports analysts and fan votes ranking all sports franchises by a combination of average fan attendance, fan relations, "Bang for your Buck" or winning percentage over the past 3 years, ownership, affordability, stadium experience, players effort on the field and likability, coaching, and "Title Track".

Logos and colors

The Los Angeles Angels have used ten different logos and three different color combinations throughout their history. Their first two logos depict a baseball with wings and a halo over a baseball diamond with the letters "L" and "A" over it in different styles. The original team colors were the predominantly blue with a red trim. This color scheme would be in effect for most of the franchise's history lasting from 1961 to 1996.

On September 2, 1965, with the team still a tenant of the Dodgers at Chavez Ravine, Autry changed its name from the "Los Angeles Angels" to the "California Angels". With the club's 1966 move to Anaheim, the logo changed as well. During the 31 years of being known as the "California Angels", the team kept the previous color scheme, however, their logo did change six times during this period. The first logo under this name was very similar to the previous "LA" logo, the only difference was instead of an interlocking "LA", there was an interlocking "CA". Directly after this from 1971 to 1985, the Angels adopted a logo that had the word "Angels" written on an outline of the State of California. Between the years 1971–1972 the "A" was lower-case while from 1973 to 1985 it was upper-case.

It was in 1965, while the stadium was being finished, that Bud Furillo (of the Herald Examiner) coined its nickname, "the Big A" after the tall letter A that once stood beyond left-center field and served as the ballpark's primary scoreboard (it was later relocated to a section of the parking lot, south-east of the stadium).

In 1986, the Angels adopted the "big A" on top of a baseball as their new logo, with the shadow of California in the background. After the "big A" was done in 1992, the Angels returned to their roots and re-adopted the interlocking "CA" logo with some differences. The Angels used this logo from 1993 to 1996, during that time, the "CA" was either on top of a blue circle or with nothing else.

After the renovations of then-Anaheim Stadium and the takeover by the Walt Disney Company, the Angels changed their name to the "Anaheim Angels" along with changing the logo and color scheme. The first logo under Disney removed the halo and had a rather cartoon-like "ANGELS" script with a wing on the "A" over a periwinkle plate and crossed bats. With this change, the Angels' color scheme changed to dark blue and periwinkle. After a run with the "winged" logo from 1997 to 2001, Disney changed the Angels' logo back to a "Big A" with a silver halo over a dark blue baseball diamond. With this logo change, the colors changed to the team's current color scheme: predominantly red with some dark blue and white.

When the team's name changed from the "Anaheim Angels" to the "Los Angeles Angels of Anaheim", the logo changed only slightly, the name "ANAHEIM ANGELS" and the blue baseball diamond were removed leaving only the "Big A".

For the 2011 season, as part of the 50th anniversary of the Angels franchise, the halo on the 'Big A' logo temporarily changed colors from silver to old gold, paying tribute to the Angels logos of the past (and also the 50th Anniversary tradition of gold). The uniforms also reflected the change to the gold halo for this season.

During the 50th Anniversary season the players wore throwback jerseys at each Friday home game reflecting all the different logos and uniforms previously worn by players. Also, Angels alumni from past seasons threw the ceremonious first pitch at every home game during the 50th Anniversary season.

A new patch was added on the uniforms before the 2012 season, featuring a red circle encircling the words "Angels Baseball" and the club logo inside and flanking the year 1961 in the middle, which was the year the Angels franchise was established.  With this new patch, the Angels' A with the halo now appears on three different locations of the jersey: the right shoulder, the wordmark, and the left shoulder.

Rivalries
The Angels have historically developed rivalries with other AL West members: the Oakland Athletics, Seattle Mariners, Texas Rangers, and, to a lesser extent, the Houston Astros, who joined the division in 2013. The Angels were also considered rivals of the New York Yankees and the Boston Red Sox due to a total of seven postseason series against the two teams in the 2000s. The Los Angeles Dodgers are considered a geographical rival as the two teams share the Greater Los Angeles television market.

Seattle Mariners
The Angels have played the Seattle Mariners several times per season since the latter's founding and entry into the AL West division in 1977. On April 11, 1990, newly-signed Angels starting pitcher Mark Langston and reliever Mike Witt threw a combined no-hitter against Seattle. The game was Langston's Angels debut and his first against his former team.

In early August of 1995, the Angels were first place in the AL West standings with the Mariners in third place at 13 games back. After enduring multiple losing streaks, the Angels relinquished their lead and finished the regular season in a tie with Seattle. The division title was decided in an extra tie-breaker game with the Mariners defeating the Angels, 9–1.

Angels outfielder Mike Trout has been credited with a history of dominant performances against the Mariners since his rookie season in 2012. During a series in Seattle in June 2022, Trout hit five home runs and became the first player in league history to hit four game-winning home runs in one series. Later that month, Trout hit his 53rd career home run against Seattle to surpass Rafael Palmeiro for most home runs against the team all-time.

On June 26, 2022, a bench-clearing brawl occurred during a game between the Angels and Mariners after Angels pitcher Andrew Wantz threw near Julio Rodríguez's back and hit Jesse Winker with a pitch in an alleged act of retribution for a ball that was thrown near Trout's head in the previous night's game. Winker charged the Angels dugout after being hit, leading to a four-minute brawl that resulted in eight ejections and 12 suspensions of players and coaches from both teams. While leaving the field, Winker flipped off a section of Angels fans sitting behind the visitors' dugout, an action he later apologized for.

Texas Rangers

The Angels-Rangers rivalry has been said to have developed over a domination in the division between the two teams, and also in recent years more animosity between the two teams due to players who have played for both teams, including Nolan Ryan, Mike Napoli, Darren Oliver, Vladimir Guerrero, C. J. Wilson, and Josh Hamilton. In 2012, Wilson played a joke on Napoli, his former teammate, by tweeting his phone number, causing Napoli to exchange words with Wilson. The feuds go back to two incidents between Angels second baseman Adam Kennedy and Rangers catcher Gerald Laird which led to punches being thrown.

The Angels and Rangers have each pitched a perfect game against each other, making them the only pair of MLB teams to have done so. Mike Witt pitched a perfect game for the Angels against the Rangers in 1984 at Arlington Stadium and Kenny Rogers for the Rangers against the Angels in 1994.

Los Angeles Dodgers

The rivalry with the Los Angeles Dodgers has been referred to as the Freeway Series because of the freeway system (mostly via Interstate 5) linking the two teams' home fields. The Freeway Series is one of four MLB rivalries between two teams in the same metropolitan area.

From 1962 to 1965, the Angels played their home games at Dodger Stadium. Dodgers owner Walter O'Malley granted approval for an American League franchise in Los Angeles under the condition that they play at Dodger Stadium. As a result, Angels owner Gene Autry signed a three-year deal to rent the stadium with a subsequent four option years. On May 5, 1962, Angels pitcher Bo Belinsky pitched the first no-hitter in Dodger Stadium history in a game against the Baltimore Orioles.

With the introduction of interleague play in the 1997 season, the Angels and Dodgers played each other in the regular season for the first time with a two-game series beginning on June 17 at Dodger Stadium. A bench-clearing brawl occurred during a June 1999 series between the two teams when Angels pitcher Tim Belcher tagged out Dodgers pitcher Chan Ho Park after his at-bat, leading to an exchange of words that was followed by Park punching and kicking Belcher. Park was ejected from the game and subsequently suspended for seven games.

Radio and television

The flagship radio station of the Angels is Orange, California-licensed KLAA 830 AM, a station owned by the team. The broadcast features Terry Smith providing play-by-play commentary since 2002 and Mark Langston providing color commentary since 2012. KLAA replaced KSPN (710 AM), on which frequency had aired most Angels games since the team's inception in 1961. The station, then known as KMPC and owned by Gene Autry, aired games from 1961 to 1996. In 1997 and 1998, the flagship station was KRLA (1110 AM). In 1999, it was replaced by KLAC (570 AM) for five seasons, including the 2002 championship season. In 2003, the Angels returned to KSPN, a partnership that lasted until 2007. Spanish-language Angels broadcasts are hosted on KWKW (1330 AM) with José Tolentino providing play-by-play commentary.

Angels games are televised on cable channel Bally Sports West (BSW). The broadcast booth features Wayne Randazzo as play-by-play announcer since 2023 and Mark Gubicza serving as color commentator since 2007. Matt Vasgersian and Patrick O'Neal provide play-by-play commentary for select games, such as when Randazzo is working the national Friday Night Baseball broadcast. As the Angels share the network with the Los Angeles Kings ice hockey team, sister channels Bally Sports SoCal and KCOP-TV may be used for broadcasts in the event of a scheduling conflict.

The Angels have been affiliated with BSW since the 1993 season when the network was originally known as Prime Ticket. The network has changed names multiple times since, including Prime Sports West, Fox Sports Net West, and Fox Sports West. Over-the-air station KTLA carried Angels games from 1964 to 1995 as both entities were owned by Gene Autry. KCAL-TV has twice held Angels broadcast rights, originally from 1961 to 1963 under the name of KHJ-TV and again from 1996 to 2005. Dick Enberg served as the Angels play-by-play announcer for KTLA from 1969 to 1978 and later won the Ford C. Frick Award in 2015 for his work with the team. Enberg was known for his signature "And the halo shines tonight" call after Angels wins in reference to the Big A sign. Former play-by-play announcer Victor Rojas (2010–2020) followed every Angels win by saying "Light that baby up," also a reference to the sign.

Awards and honors

Retired numbers

 No. 26 was retired for Gene Autry to indicate he was the team's "26th Man" (25 was, at the time, the player limit for any MLB team's active roster, except in September)
No. 42 was retired throughout Major League Baseball in 1997 to honor Jackie Robinson.

Out of circulation, but not retired
No. 1 has been out of circulation since the retirement of Bengie Molina.
No. 15 has been out of circulation since the retirement of Tim Salmon at the end of the 2006 season.
No. 45 has been out of circulation since the death of Tyler Skaggs in 2019.

Angels Hall of Fame

The Angels established a team Hall of Fame in 1988. They have inducted fifteen individuals (fourteen players and one executive) along with members of the 2002 team.

Team captains
 Jerry Remy, 1977
 Don Baylor, 1978–1982

Baseball Hall of Fame
Also, several Hall of Famers have spent part of their careers with the Angels and the Hall lists the Angels as the "primary team" of Nolan Ryan.

Ford C. Frick Award recipients

Roster

Minor league affiliations

The Los Angeles Angels farm system consists of six minor league affiliates.

In popular culture

 A 1985 episode of The Jeffersons titled "The Unnatural" featured the Angels. George Jefferson is disheartened after dropping a foul ball hit by Reggie Jackson on live television. George's wife, Louise, recruits Jackson's help to cheer him up. Brian Downing and Mike Witt also portrayed themselves in minor roles.
 The team is featured prominently in the 1988 comedy film The Naked Gun. Police lieutenant Frank Drebin (Leslie Nielsen) secretly umpires a game between the Angels and Seattle Mariners while Reggie Jackson portrays himself in the movie.
 The 1990 comedy Taking Care of Business features a fictional World Series matchup between the Angels and the Chicago Cubs. Angels pitcher Bert Blyleven was cast in the film.
 The 1991 movie Talent for the Game features Edward James Olmos as a baseball scout for the Angels.
 The Angels play a central role in the 1994 Disney film Angels in the Outfield, a remake of the 1951 film of the same title which featured the Pittsburgh Pirates in the same role.
 In 1999, the movie For Love of the Game features a scene near the climax of the film when Billy Chapel (Kevin Costner) mentions he's in Anaheim to play against the Angels.
 During Disney's ownership of the Angels, the team was featured in the films Air Bud: Seventh Inning Fetch, Deuce Bigalow: Male Gigolo, and TV movie Angels in the Infield.
 In 2014, the Angels and Angel Stadium were featured in season eight of The Big Bang Theory in an episode titled "The First Pitch Insufficiency".

See also
 List of Los Angeles Angels first-round draft picks
 List of Los Angeles Angels no-hitters
 List of Los Angeles Angels Opening Day starting pitchers
 List of Los Angeles Angels owners and executives
 List of Los Angeles Angels seasons

Notes

References

Further reading
Bisheff, Steve. Tales from the Angels Dugout: The Championship Season and Other Great Angels Stories. Sports Publishing L.L.C., 2003. .
2005 Angels Information Guide.

External links

 
 Los Angeles Angels Baseball-Reference.com

 
Major League Baseball teams
Sports teams in Anaheim, California
Baseball teams established in 1961
Cactus League